Dr. Darrell Coleman Richardson (May 17, 1918 – September 19, 2006) was an American Baptist minister and bibliographer, the author of 44 books. He served as Director of the National Fantasy Fan Federation and was involved in the Cincinnati Fantasy Group and the Memphis Science Fiction Association. Richardson was a noted authority on authors Frederick Faust and Edgar Rice Burroughs. The Darrell Awards are named in his honor. His best known work, Max Brand: The Man and His Work, was published by Fantasy Publishing Company, Inc. in 1952.

Awards
 E. E. Evans Big Heart Award (1982)
 Lamont Award (1986)
 Phoenix Award (1992)

References

Citations

External links

 
 

1918 births
2006 deaths
American bibliographers
People from Baxter Springs, Kansas
20th-century Baptist ministers from the United States